Always Something There is an album by jazz saxophonist Stanley Turrentine recorded for the Blue Note label in 1968 and performed by Turrentine with orchestra and strings arranged by Thad Jones.

Reception

The Allmusic review by Michael Erlewine, awarded the album 2 stars.

Track listing
 "(There's) Always Something There to Remind Me" (Burt Bacharach, Hal David) - 2:40 
 "Little Green Apples" (Bobby Russell) - 4:05
 "When I Look into Your Eyes" (Leslie Bricusse) - 2:30    
 "Light My Fire" (John Densmore, Robbie Krieger, Ray Manzarek, Jim Morrison) - 3:05
 "Those Were the Days" (Gene Raskin) - 4:10
 "Stoned Soul Picnic" (Laura Nyro) - 4:00
 "Home Town" (Thad Jones) - 4:20
 "Song for Bonnie" (Tommy Turrentine) - 2:30
 "Hey Jude" (John Lennon, Paul McCartney) - 5:10
 "The Fool on the Hill" (Lennon, McCartney) - 3:40
Recorded at A&R Studios, NYC on October 1, 1968 (tracks 2 & 10), October 14, 1968 (tracks 1, 4 & 9), and October 28, 1968 (tracks 3 & 5-8).

Personnel
Stanley Turrentine - tenor saxophone
Burt Collins - flugelhorn
Jimmy Cleveland - trombone
Dick Berg, Jim Buffington, Brooks Tillotson  - French horn
Jerry Dodgion - alto saxophone, flute, clarinet
Jerome Richardson - tenor saxophone, flute clarinet
Hank Jones (tracks 2, 3, 5-8, 10), Herbie Hancock (tracks 1, 4, 9) - piano
Barry Galbraith (tracks 2, 10), Kenny Burrell - guitar
Bob Cranshaw - bass, electric bass
Mel Lewis (tracks 1, 2, 4, 9 & 10), Mickey Roker (tracks 3, 5-8) - drums
Thad Jones - trumpet, arranger
Overdubbed string section

References

1968 albums
Stanley Turrentine albums
Blue Note Records albums